Putcher fishing is a type of fishing (usually of salmon) which employs multiple putcher baskets, set in a fixed wooden frame, against the tide in a river estuary, notably on the River Severn, in England and South East Wales. Putchers are placed in rows, standing four or five high, in a wooden "rank" set out against the incoming and/or outgoing tides.

Traditionally the putcher was made of hazel rods with withy (willow) plait, both materials being grown locally on the Caldicot and Wentloog Levels. Modern baskets made of steel or aluminium wire were introduced in the 1940s and 1950s.

See also
 Eel basket
 Fish trap
 Basket weaving
 Snare trap

References

External links 

 blackrocklavenets

Fishing techniques and methods
Fishing equipment
Basket weaving
History of Monmouthshire
River Severn
Fishing in England
Fishing in Wales